Chris Tilton (born June 9, 1979 in New Orleans, Louisiana, United States) is an American soundtrack composer and has helped compose several television, film and video game scores.  He has collaborated with Michael Giacchino and J. J. Abrams on several of his projects.  His projects include the video games Mercenaries: Playground of Destruction, Black, Fracture, SimCity, Assassin's Creed Unity, and the television series Zoo and Fringe. He also collaborated with Giacchino and Andrea Datzman for J. J. Abrams' series Undercovers, until its cancellation in 2010.

Video games

References

External links
 Official web site
 

1979 births
21st-century American composers
21st-century American male musicians
American television composers
Living people
Male television composers
Video game composers